The U.S. House Financial Services Subcommittee on Domestic Monetary Policy and Technology is a subcommittee of the House Committee on Financial Services. The committee was formerly part of the Subcommittee on Domestic and International Monetary Policy, Trade, and Technology until the 111th Congress, when a separate Subcommittee on International Monetary Policy and Trade was created.

Jurisdiction
The jurisdiction of the Subcommittee on Domestic Monetary Policy and Technology includes—

(i) financial aid to all sectors and elements within the 
economy;

(ii) economic growth and stabilization;
 
(iii) defense production matters as contained in the Defense Production Act of 1950, as amended;

(iv) domestic monetary policy, and agencies which directly or indirectly affect domestic monetary policy, including the effect of such policy and other financial actions on interest rates, the allocation of credit, and the structure and functioning of domestic financial institutions [such as the Federal Reserve System];

(v) coins, coinage, currency, and medals, including commemorative coins and medals, proof and mint sets and other special coins, the Coinage Act of 1965, gold and silver, including the coinage thereof (but not the par value of gold), gold medals, counterfeiting, currency denominations and design, the distribution of coins, and the operations of the Bureau of the Mint and the Bureau of Engraving and Printing; and 

(vi) development of new or alternative forms of currency.

Members, 112th Congress
In December 2010, Bloomberg Businessweek reported that incoming Speaker of the House John Boehner was considering ways to prevent Ron Paul, who has long been a critic of Ben Bernanke and the Federal Reserve System, from becoming chair of the subcommittee or restrict his authority. Paul has stated that he will use the position to draw attention to the Fed's policies and what he perceives to be its negative consequences.

References

External links
Official site

Financial Services Domestic Monetary Policy and Technology
Monetary policy of the United States